The 2019 South Somerset District Council election took place on 2 May 2019 to elect members of South Somerset District Council in Somerset, England. The whole council was up for election on new boundaries. The Liberal Democrats held the council with an increased majority, up from 1 to 22.

Result Summary

Results by Ward

Blackdown & Tatworth

Blackmoor Vale

Bruton

Brympton

Burrow Hill

Camelot

Cary

Chard Avishayes

Chard Combe

Chard Crimchard

Chard Holyrood

Chard Jocelyn

Coker

Crewkerne

Curry Rivel, Huish & Langport Ward

Eggwood

Hamdon

Ilminster

Islemoor

Martock

Milborne Port

Neroche

Northstone, Ivelchester & St Michael's Ward

Parrett

South Petherton

Tower

Turn Hill

Wessex

Wincanton

Windwhistle

Yeovil College

Yeovil Lyde

Yeovil Summerlands

Yeovil Westland

Yeovil Without

By-elections

References 

South Somerset District Council elections
2019 English local elections
May 2019 events in the United Kingdom